Bundanoon railway station is a heritage-listed railway station on the Main South line in New South Wales, Australia. It serves the small town of Bundanoon. It was added to the New South Wales State Heritage Register on 2 April 1999.

History

The station opened on 6 August 1868 as Jordans Crossing, being renamed Jordans Siding in 1878 and finally Bundanoon in 1881.

The station has a signal box on platform 2 which controls a set of points just to the north of the station. Until the 2005 timetable one afternoon train a day terminated using this setup, the train arriving on platform 1 using the set of points, and departing back towards Campbelltown. This practice was discontinued, the signal box and points closed and the route curtailed to end at Moss Vale.

Bundanoon station celebrated 150 years since it opened on Sunday 5 August 2018.

Platforms & services
Bundanoon has two side platforms. It is serviced by early morning and evening NSW TrainLink Southern Highlands Line services travelling between Sydney Central, Campbelltown, Moss Vale and Goulburn.

During the day the station is served by a NSW TrainLink road coach service from Wollongong and another operating from Moss Vale to Goulburn.

It is also serviced by NSW Trainlink Xplorer long-distance services from Sydney to Canberra & Griffith. This station is a request stop for this service, so the train stops only if passengers booked to board/alight here.

Transport links
Berrima Buslines operate one route via Bundanoon station:
813: Moss Vale to Tallong

Description 

The station complex consists of a timber station building on the northbound platform and another timber station building of an initial island side building design with brick-faced platforms. It also contains a corrugated iron former toilet and shed, timber skillion roofed signal box (1914) and timber parcels office, all situated on the platforms, and a 30'x15' corrugated iron goods shed of a side shed design.

Heritage listing 
Bundanoon station and yard group is an excellent example of an early 20th century station complex with remnants of the early period of construction including the unusual and rare small goods shed. The original buildings for a small country location were expanded to take advantage of the holiday market in the early years of the century. The length of platforms indicate the relative importance of the station and the need for longer distance trains to stop here. The location of the site at a major intersection in the village of Bundanoon makes it an important visual element in the historic townscape that contributes significantly to the visual importance of the town. All of the listed elements contribute to the group and give a clear indication of the operation and style of a  1913 station group.

Bundanoon railway station was listed on the New South Wales State Heritage Register on 2 April 1999.

References

Attribution

External links

Bundanoon station details Transport for New South Wales

Railway stations in Australia opened in 1868
Regional railway stations in New South Wales
New South Wales State Heritage Register
Articles incorporating text from the New South Wales State Heritage Register
Wingecarribee Shire
Main Southern railway line, New South Wales